In Greek mythology, Oeonus (Ancient Greek: Οἰωνὸν) was a son of Licymnius who accompanied Heracles.  He was killed in Sparta in Heracles's company.  Heracles had promised Licymnius that he would bring back his son, and so, when Oeonus died, Heracles burned his body and took the ashes back to the father. This is supposed to be the origin of the Greek practice of cremation.

Notes

References 

 Apollodorus, The Library with an English Translation by Sir James George Frazer, F.B.A., F.R.S. in 2 Volumes, Cambridge, MA, Harvard University Press; London, William Heinemann Ltd. 1921. ISBN 0-674-99135-4. Online version at the Perseus Digital Library. Greek text available from the same website.
 Pausanias, Description of Greece with an English Translation by W.H.S. Jones, Litt.D., and H.A. Ormerod, M.A., in 4 Volumes. Cambridge, MA, Harvard University Press; London, William Heinemann Ltd. 1918. . Online version at the Perseus Digital Library
 Pausanias, Graeciae Descriptio. 3 vols. Leipzig, Teubner. 1903.  Greek text available at the Perseus Digital Library.
 Pindar, Odes translated by Diane Arnson Svarlien. 1990. Online version at the Perseus Digital Library.
 Pindar, The Odes of Pindar including the Principal Fragments with an Introduction and an English Translation by Sir John Sandys, Litt.D., FBA. Cambridge, MA., Harvard University Press; London, William Heinemann Ltd. 1937. Greek text available at the Perseus Digital Library.
 Smith, William. (1870). Dictionary of Greek and Roman Biography and Mythology. London: Taylor, Walton, and Maberly.

Characters in Greek mythology